Banksia cypholoba is a species of dwarf, prostrate shrub that is endemic to Western Australia. It has pinnatipartite leaves with twenty-five to forty triangular lobes on each side, heads of about sixty brownish and yellow flowers and mostly glabrous follicles.

Description
The flowers are borne on a head containing between fifty and sixty flowers.

Taxonomy and naming
This banksia was first formally described in 1996 by Alex George in the journal Nuytsia and given the name Dryandra cypholoba from specimens he collected in 1986 near Warradarge. In 2007, Austin Mast and Kevin Thiele transferred all the dryandras to the genus Banksia and this species became Banksia cypholoba. The specific epithet (cypholoba) is derived from Greek words meaning "bent" or "humped" and "a lobe", referring to the lobes of the leaves.

Distribution and habitat
Banksia cypholoba grows in kwongan or in thick scrub between Arrino and the Alexander Morrison National Park in the Geraldton Sandplains biogeographic region.

Conservation status
This banksia is classified as "Priority Three" by the Government of Western Australia Department of Parks and Wildlife meaning that it is poorly known and known from only a few locations but is not under imminent threat.

References

cypholoba
Endemic flora of Western Australia
Eudicots of Western Australia
Plants described in 1996
Taxa named by Kevin Thiele